The 2017 British Motocross Championship is the 66th British Motocross Championship season. Tommy Searle will start the season as the defending Champion in the MX1 class having taken his first national title in 2016. In the MX2 class, Adam Sterry starts the season as defending champion, but he will not compete in the series in 2017. For 2017, a new national 2-stroke championship will be contested at four rounds of the championship.

MX1

Calendar and Results
An 8-round calendar for the 2017 season was announced on 28 October 2016.

Participants
List of confirmed riders.

Riders Championship

MX2

Calendar and Results
An 8-round calendar for the 2017 season was announced on 28 October 2016.

Participants
List of confirmed riders.

Riders Championship

References 

Motocross Championship
British Motocross Championship
National championships in the United Kingdom